The County Hound 3 is the fourth studio album by American rapper Cashis. The album was released on April 7, 2015 by his label Bogish Brand Entertainment. The album features guest appearances from Young Buck, Arez Cobain, Project Pat, Problem, Roscoe, Emilio Rojas among others. Rikanatti handles a majority of the production on the project.

Track listing

See also 
 The County Hound EP
 The County Hound 2

References 

2015 albums
Cashis albums
Albums produced by Eminem
Sequel albums